The Embassy of the Philippines in Washington, D.C. ( also ) is the diplomatic mission of the Republic of the Philippines to the United States. It is located at 1600 Massachusetts Avenue, Northwest, Washington, D.C. It predates the independence of the Philippines, and is the oldest Philippine legation overseas, though the distinction of the first Philippine embassy proper overseas, belongs to the Philippine Embassy in Tokyo.

History
The original chancery of the Philippine Embassy, a house built in 1917 for Daniel C. Stapleton on a design by local architect Clarke Waggaman, was purchased by the Office of the Resident Commissioner of the Philippines during the period of service of Joaquin Elizalde. During World War II, from May 1942 onwards, it became the headquarters of the Government in exile of the Commonwealth of the Philippines and temporary capital of the Philippines until the Commonwealth government returned to the Philippines in October, 1944. On July 4, 1946, the embassy was formally established.

President Manuel L. Quezon sojourned at the Shoreham Hotel during the war and had plans to turn his room into a permanent official residence, but these plans were abandoned by Sergio Osmeña after he became President of the Philippines. The mansion at 2253 R Street NW, built in 1904 on a design by Waddy Butler Wood, was subsequently purchased in 1954 and has been the ambassador's residence since. That same building had hosted the legation of Czechoslovakia in 1928–29.

In 1991, construction of a new chancery began on a trapezoidal island on Massachusetts Avenue, bordered by 17th Street, N Street, Bataan street, and Massachusetts Avenue, across from the old building. Completed in 1993, the present-day chancery is a four-story of beaux-arts design with a smooth-finish precast, blending nicely with the traditional limestone structures of Embassy Row.

The old chancery, meanwhile, was converted into the embassy's consular section in the late 2016.

References

External links

Official Website of the Philippine Embassy in Washington, D.C.
wikimapia

Philippines
Washington, D.C.
Philippines–United States relations
Philippines
Government buildings completed in 1993
1990s architecture in the United States